Kraftverkene i Øvre Namsen ("The Power Stations in Upper Namsen") or KØN was a joint venture between the Norwegian Water Resources and Energy Directorate (NVE) and Nord-Trøndelag Elektrisitetsverk (NTE).
The venture started in 1958 and consisted of three wholly owned hydroelectric power stations in Norway and a partial ownership in one power station in Sweden, which opened between 1962 and 1965. With the establishment of Statkraft, the NVE's shares were transferred there. In 2004, NTE bought Statkraft's share, and the power production was incorporated into NTE's operations.

References

Defunct electric power companies of Norway
Energy companies established in 1958
1958 establishments in Norway
Companies based in Trøndelag
Energy companies disestablished in 2004
2004 disestablishments in Norway
2004 mergers and acquisitions